Levi Marston (June 3, 1816 – August 3, 1904) was an American sea captain from Maine. In 1852, he was awarded a gold medal for heroism by Queen Victoria after he saved over three hundred immigrants from a British shipwreck.

Life and career 
Marston was born in North Yarmouth, Massachusetts (now in Maine), to Thomas Marston and Eunice Roberts.

He first went to sea at the age of fourteen, and went on to command his own brig, Harriet. He sailed around Cape Horn thirty-two times during trading in China, the West Indies and on the coasts of the Atlantic and Pacific Oceans.

On November 9, 1851, he saved the lives of over three hundred immigrants from the British ship Unicorn which had been wrecked during a storm near Grand Banks of Newfoundland. The following year, he was awarded a gold medal for heroism by Queen Victoria.

He married twice: firstly to Lavinia Mitchell (who died in 1880), then, four years later, to her sister Mary Louise Mitchell. They were daughters of John Mitchell and Eliza Gooding. Levi was Mary's third husband.

Marston lived at Riverside Farm on North Road in today's Yarmouth. His daughter, Ellen, and her husband, James Lawrence, assumed ownership of the farm when he moved to Yarmouth.

He helped begin Yarmouth's Methodist church in the 1890s.

Death 
Marston died on August 3, 1904, aged 88. He is interred in North Yarmouth's Pine Grove Cemetery, in a plot with both of his wives.

See also 

 List of shipwrecks in November 1851

References 

1816 births
1904 deaths
People from Yarmouth, Maine
Sea captains
People from North Yarmouth, Maine